Guerra de Titanes (1998) ("War of the Titans") was the second Guerra de Titanes professional wrestling show promoted by AAA. The show took place on December 13, 1998 in Chihuahua, Chihuahua, Mexico. The Main event featured a Steel Cage Match that highlighted two storyline feuds between Octagón and his "Evil twin" Pentagón and the feud between Heavy Metal and Kick Boxer as Octagón and Heavy Metal teamed together to take on Pentagón and Kick Boxer.

Production

Background
Starting in 1997 the Mexican professional wrestling, company AAA has held a major wrestling show late in the year, either November or December, called Guerra de Titanes ("War of the Titans"). The show often features championship matches or Lucha de Apuestas or bet matches where the competitors risked their wrestling mask or hair on the outcome of the match. In Lucha Libre the Lucha de Apuestas match is considered more prestigious than a championship match and a lot of the major shows feature one or more Apuesta matches. The Guerra de Titanes show is hosted by a new location each year, emanating from cities such as Madero, Chihuahua, Chihuahua, Mexico City, Guadalajara, Jalisco and more. The 1998 Guerra de Titanes show was the second show in the series.

Storylines
The Guerra de Titanes show featured four professional wrestling matches with different wrestlers involved in pre-existing, scripted feuds, plots, and storylines. Wrestlers were portrayed as either heels (referred to as rudos in Mexico, those that portray the "bad guys") or faces (técnicos in Mexico, the "good guy" characters) as they followed a series of tension-building events, which culminated in a wrestling match or series of matches.

Results

References

1998 in Mexico
1998 in professional wrestling
Guerra de Titanes
December 1998 events in Mexico